Oculinidae is a family of colonial corals.

Characteristics
Members of the family Oculinidae are characterised by having the walls of the corallites (the cups which house the polyps) being composed of solid walled though rather fragile tubes connected by a smooth skeletal material called coenosteum. The corallites are widely spaced and robust. The septa (ridges on the corallite walls) curve noticeably outward giving the coral a spiky appearance. Many species in this family form a symbiotic relationship with the flagellate protozoa zooxanthellae which live within the tissues of the polyps. These are photosynthetic algae that provide nutrients for the polyps while themselves benefiting from a safe environment and an elevated, sunny position.

Genera
The World Register of Marine Species lists the following genera:

 Bantamia Yabe & Eguchi, 1943 †
 Bathelia Moseley, 1881
 Cyathelia Milne-Edwards & Haime, 1849
 Madrepora Linnaeus, 1758
 Oculina Lamarck, 1816
 Petrophyllia Conrad, 1855
 Schizoculina Wells, 1937
 Sclerhelia Milne Edwards & Haime, 1850

Distribution
The genera Oculina and Schizoculina are found in the Atlantic Ocean. Most species are uncommon.

References

 
Taxa named by John Edward Gray
Scleractinia
Cnidarian families